The Rock-hewn Churches of Ivanovo (Ivanovski skalni tsarkvi) are a group of monolithic churches, chapels and monasteries hewn out of solid rock and completely different from other monastery complexes in Bulgaria, located near the village of Ivanovo, 20 km south of Rousse, on the high rocky banks of the Rusenski Lom, 32 m above the river. The complex is noted for its beautiful and well-preserved medieval frescoes. The churches are inside Rusenski Lom Nature Park.

History

The caves in the region had been inhabited by monks from the 1220s, when it was founded by the future Patriarch of Bulgaria Joachim I, to the 17th century, where they hewed cells, churches and chapels out of solid rock. At the peak of the monastery complex, the number of churches was about 40, while the other premises were around 300, most of which are not preserved today.

Second Bulgarian Empire rulers such as Ivan Alexander and Ivan Asen II frequently made donations to the complex, as evidenced by donor portraits in some of the churches. Other patrons included nobles from the capital Tarnovo and nearest big medieval town Cherven, with which the monastery complex had strong ties in the 13th and 14th century. It was a centre of hesychasm in the Bulgarian lands in the 14th century and continued to exist in the early centuries of the Ottoman rule of Bulgaria, but gradually decayed.

The Rock-hewn Churches of Ivanovo were included in the UNESCO World Heritage List in 1979.

Preserved heritage
The monastery complex owes much of its fame to 13th- and 14th-century frescoes, preserved in five of the churches, which are thought of as wonderful examples of Bulgarian mediaeval art. The rock premises used by the monks include the St Archangel Michael Chapel ("The Buried Church"), the Baptistery, the Gospodev Dol Chapel, the St Theodore Church ("The Demolished Church") and the main Church, with the 14th-century murals in the latter one being arguably the most famous of all in Ivanovo and noted as some of the most representative examples of Palaeologan art. 

Many century-old inscriptions have also been preserved in the monastical premises, including the famous indented inscription of the monk Ivo Gramatik from 1308–1309.

Burials
George I of Bulgaria

See also 
 Aladzha Monastery
 Albotin Monastery
 Cave monastery
 Monolithic church

References

External links

Rock-Hewn Churches of Ivanovo at whc.unesco.org
Velmans, Tania. Les Fresques d'Ivanovo et la peinture byzantine à la fin du Moyen Âge. - Journal des savants. 1965, N°1. pp. 358-412

Churches in Bulgaria
World Heritage Sites in Bulgaria
Buildings and structures in Ruse Province
Medieval Bulgarian Orthodox church buildings
Eastern Orthodox church buildings
Medieval churches
Christian monasteries in Bulgaria
Tourist attractions in Ruse Province
Cave monasteries
Rock-cut architecture